Simon Turner may refer to:

 Simon Fisher Turner (born 1954), English musician and actor
 Simon Turner (album)
 Simon Turner (cricketer) (born 1960), English cricketer
 Simon Turner, fictional character in the video game Indiana Jones and the Infernal Machine